Daniels Park, a former working ranch in Douglas County, Colorado near Sedalia, Colorado, was listed on the National Register of Historic Places in 1995. The park is one of the Denver Mountain Parks. A herd of bison lives in the park, and the bison graze on the prairie grass in the park's upper elevations. Because of the presence of the Bison, most of the park is not open to the public. It is located along Douglas County Road 67 northeast of Sedalia.

The  listing included four clusters of structures, including a total of 10 contributing buildings, nine contributing structures, and three contributing sites. The ranch is rumored to have been the site of Kit Carson's last campfire.

It includes some construction dating from 1920, and work by architect Jules Jacques Benoit Benedict. It also includes rustic architecture, and parts or whole have had names Florence Martin Ranch, Riley Hill, and Wild Cat Point. Florence Martin was an Australian-American philanthropist who donated the ranch's  to establish Daniels Park.

History
In June 2022, Douglas County's commissioners issued a proposal to take over Daniels Park in retaliation against Denver following a May vote by Denver city council to prohibit concealed carrying weapons in city parks.

References

National Register of Historic Places in Douglas County, Colorado
Historic districts on the National Register of Historic Places in Colorado
Ranches in Colorado
Buildings and structures completed in 1920
Denver Mountain Parks